Mannino is an Italian/Sicilian family name which originated in San Piero Patti in the Province of Messina in Sicily. People with the surname Mannino include:

Calogero Mannino (born 1939), Italian politician and lawyer
Franco Mannino (1924–2005), Italian film composer
Jason Mannino (born 1975), American racquetball player
Julio Mannino, Mexican actor
Lorenzo Mannino, Italian-American crime boss
Peter Mannino (born 1984), American hockey player
Teresa Mannino (born 1970), Italian comedian and actress

References 

Surnames